Nanna Prakara is a 2019 Indian Kannada language mystery thriller film written and directed by Vinay Balaji, making his debut. It is produced by Gururaj S under his banner G.V.K Combines and is co-produced by Kiran Talasila, Jagdeesh, Venkatesh, Govind. S and Krishnamurthy. The film starring Kishore, Priyamani and Mayuri Kyatari in the lead roles while, Arjun Yogi, Niranjan Deshpande, Pramod Shetty and Girija Lokesh are in the ensemble supporting cast. The music for the film is scored by Arjun Ramu. The cinematography is by Manohar Joshi and editing is done by Satish Chandraiya.

Cast 
Credits adapted from The Times of India.

Priyamani as Dr Amrutha
Kishore as Ashok
Mayuri Kyatari as Vismaya
 Pramod Shetty as Kumar
Girija Lokesh as Shardhamma
 Arjun Yogi
 Niranjan Deshpande
Tiger sushma raj

Production 
Actor Kishore, has said "With Nanna Prakara, working with a first-time director ensures that there is a different insight into filmmaking and a young energy on set, which rubs off on everyone" while talking about the Principal photography. The film will mark the directorial debut of Vinay Balaji. Priyamani, who plays a doctor on the film said she put a lot of effort "to play the role convincingly".

Soundtrack 
The soundtrack for the film is done by Arjun Ramu. The film's audio rights have been sold Zee Music South.

Reception 
The Times of India wrote, "For starters, he has two powerhouse performers — Kishore and Priya Mani — in the lead and he is confident about the strength of the content, which had his protagonists intrigued enough to work with him. “At the centre of the narrative is a murder mystery that Kishore, as Inspector Ashok, is investigating".

References

External links 
 

2019 films
Indian mystery thriller films
2010s mystery thriller films
Films shot in Bangalore
Films shot in Mysore
2010s Kannada-language films
Films set in universities and colleges
2019 directorial debut films
2019 thriller films